Taken is a crime novel by the American writer Kathleen George set in 1990s Pittsburgh, Pennsylvania.

It tells the story of a baby taken in broad daylight downtown Pittsburgh. Protagonist Marina Benedict gets involved, and detective Richard Christie takes on the task of finding the missing child of a rookie pitcher for the Pittsburgh Pirates.

Sources
Contemporary Authors Online. The Gale Group, 2006. PEN (Permanent Entry Number):  0000142340.

External links
  Kathleen George website

2001 American novels
American crime novels
Novels set in Pittsburgh